Helen is a city in White County, Georgia, United States, located along the Chattahoochee River. The population was 531 at the 2020 census.

History
Helen was platted in 1912, and named after the daughter of a lumber official. The town was incorporated in 1913.

Formerly a logging town that was in decline, the city resurrected itself by becoming a replica of a Bavarian alpine town, in the Appalachians instead of the Alps. This design is mandated through zoning first adopted in 1969, so that the classic southern German style is present on every building, even on the small number of national franchisees present (such as Huddle House and Wendy's).

In 1975, Documerica photographer Al Stephenson documented the life, recreation, and economy of the Helen area before and during the construction of Alpine Helen.

Modern day

Tourism is a key economic activity in Helen, catering mostly to weekend visitors from the Atlanta area and also motorcyclists who enjoy riding the roads in Helen and its surrounding areas.  Helen can be crowded in late October, when autumn leaves typically peak. It also hosts its own Oktoberfest during September, October and November. Events and festivals are held throughout the year, including the "Southern Worthersee", which is a stateside Volkswagen and Audi event that pays tribute to the Worthersee Tour in Austria. An annual hot-air balloon race is also held here on the first weekend in June.

The main road through town is north–south Georgia 75. The Helen stream gauge (HDCG1) is located on its bridge over the Chattahoochee in the middle of downtown. A parallel route to the west is labeled Georgia 75 Alt to identify it as a bypass route around the town and its traffic jams in the autumn and on some weekends.

Unicoi State Park and Lodge, spanning , is located immediately northeast of Helen on Georgia 356. The park encompasses Unicoi Lake, a  freshwater lake, offering outdoor activities for all seasons. Among these are a swimming beach, trout streams, wheelchair-accessible fishing docks, seasonal canoe, kayak and paddle boat rentals, seven picnic shelters with charcoal grills, three playgrounds for children, spots for birding,  of hiking within the park (with adjacent trails in the Chattahoochee National Forest),  of mountain biking trails within the park, and a number of places to enjoy the natural environment of the lake and park. Unicoi State Park also offers lodging in several forms. Access to Anna Ruby Falls, part of the Chattahoochee National Forest, is through the park.

Hardman Farm State Historic Site is located near Helen.

Geography
Helen is located at  (34.702396, -83.727508).

Georgia State Routes 17 and 75 are the main routes through the city, and run through the downtown area together as North Main Street. GA-17/75 lead north together  to Hiawassee. The two highways split south of the city, with GA-17 leading southeast  to Clarkesville and GA-75 leading south  to Cleveland, the White County seat.

Climate

Transportation

Major roads

  State Route 17
  State Route 75
  State Route 356

Pedestrians and cycling

 River Hiking Trail
 Unicoi State Park Trail

Demographics

2020 census

As of the 2020 United States census, there were 531 people, 271 households, and 161 families residing in the city. The total population figure is disputed by city officials, as it is triple what it was a decade earlier. The discrepancy may be due changes in Census Bureau counting methodology.

2000 census
As of the census of 2000, there were 430 people, 208 households, and 112 families residing in the city. The racial makeup of the city was 82.56% White, 5.12% African American, 0.23% Native American, 10.93% Asian, 0.23% Pacific Islander, 0.47% from other races, and 0.47% from two or more races. Hispanic or Latino of any race were 3.02% of the population.

There were 208 households, out of which 25.0% had children under the age of 18 living with them, 38.0% were married couples living together, 11.5% had a female householder with no husband present, and 45.7% were non-families. 42.8% of all households were made up of individuals, and 14.4% had someone living alone who was 65 years of age or older. The average household size was 2.07 and the average family size was 2.83.

In the city the population was spread out, with 20.5% under the age of 18, 6.7% from 18 to 24, 27.9% from 25 to 44, 28.8% from 45 to 64, and 16.0% who were 65 years of age or older. The median age was 42 years. For every 100 females, there were 91.1 males. For every 100 females age 18 and over, there were 87.9 males.

The median income for a household in the city was $32,917, and the median income for a family was $40,781. Males had a median income of $39,107 versus $23,750 for females. The per capita income for the city was $22,281.  About 6.7% of families and 8.2% of the population were below the poverty line, including 8.1% of those under age 18 and 8.8% of those age 65 or over.

Sister city
 Füssen, Bavaria

See also 
 Frankenmuth, Michigan
 Leavenworth, Washington
 Pella, Iowa
 Solvang, California

Education
Alpine Public Schools are part of the White County School District, which includes four elementary schools, one middle school, and one high school.
Dr. Laurie Burkett is the Superintendent of Schools (since 2018). The district has 233 full-time teachers and over 3,758 students.

Film and television
Smokey and the Bandit (1977) includes a scene filmed on Chimney Mountain Rd. just outside of Helen.

In the episode "Helen" from Season 2: Robbin' Season of the television series Atlanta, main characters Vanessa and Earn visit Helen for a Fastnacht celebration. The character Vanessa, played by Zazie Beetz, is from Helen and is fluent in German. The episode aired on March 22, 2018.

The Lifetime TV movie "Christmas Love Letter" was filmed in Helen and aired on December 21, 2019.

Gallery

References

External links

 
 
 Travel destination site for Helen, GA
 Helen Convention and Visitors Bureau
 Helen to the Atlantic Hot Air Balloon Race & Festival

Cities in Georgia (U.S. state)
Cities in White County, Georgia
German-American culture in Georgia (U.S. state)
Georgia populated places on the Chattahoochee River
Oktoberfest
Roadside attractions in Georgia (U.S. state)